Canthium is a genus of flowering plants in the family Rubiaceae. They are shrubs and small trees. The leaves are deciduous and the stems are usually thorny.

Distribution
Canthium species are predominantly found in Southeast Asia, especially in Thailand and the Philippines. A small number of species is found in India, Sri Lanka, and Bangladesh. Only a limited number of species is found on the African continent, especially in Southern and East Africa.

Taxonomy
Canthium was named by Jean-Baptiste Lamarck in 1785 in Encyclopédie Méthodique. The name is a latinisation of "kantankara", a Malayalam name from Kerala for Canthium coromandelicum. Kantan means "shining" and kara means "a spiny shrub". The biological type for the genus consists of specimens originally described by Jean-Baptiste Lamarck as Canthium parviflorum but this species is now included in Canthium coromandelicum. Canthium is a member of Vanguerieae, a tribe that is monophyletic and easily recognized morphologically, but in which generic boundaries were, for a long time, very unclear. Canthium was especially problematic, and until the 1980s, it was defined broadly and known to be polyphyletic. Psydrax was separated from it in 1985, as was Keetia in 1986. These were followed by Pyrostria and Multidentia in 1987. The subgenus Afrocanthium was raised to generic rank in 2004, followed by Bullockia in 2009. A few species were transferred to Canthium from Rytigynia and other genera in 2004. The genus was further reduced by the transfer of species to Peponidium and Pyrostria. In 2016, two Canthium species endemic to the Philippines were transferred to a genus of their own, Kanapia. The final circumscription of Canthium will remain in doubt until phylogenetic studies achieve greater resolution for the clade containing Canthium coromandelicum and its closest relatives.

Species
, Plants of the World Online recognises the following species:

 Canthium aciculatum Ridl.
 Canthium angustifolium Roxb.
 Canthium arboreum Vidal
 Canthium aurantiacum Merr. & L.M.Perry
 Canthium berberidifolium Geddes
 Canthium bipinnatum (Blanco) Merr.
 Canthium brunneum (Merr.) Merr.
 Canthium calvum Craib
 Canthium cambodianum Pit.
 Canthium campanulatum Thwaites
 Canthium cavaleriei H.Lév.
 Canthium ciliatum (D.Dietr.) Kuntze
 Canthium coffeoides Pierre ex Pit.
 Canthium congestiflorum Ridl.
 Canthium cordatum Dillwyn
 Canthium coromandelicum (Brum.f.) Alston
 Canthium depressinerve Ridl.
 Canthium ellipticum (Merr.) Merr.
 Canthium fenicis (Merr.) Merr.
 Canthium ferrugineum Craib
 Canthium filipendulum Pierre ex Pit.
 Canthium fraternum Miq.
 Canthium glaucum Hiern
 Canthium gracilipes Kurz
 Canthium hainanense (Merr.) Lantz
 Canthium hirtellum Ridl.
 Canthium hispidonervosum (De Wild.) C.M.Evrard
 Canthium horridulum Craib
 Canthium horridum Blume
 Canthium inerme (L.f.) Kuntze
 Canthium korthalsianum Miq.
 Canthium kuntzeanum Bridson
 Canthium laeve Teijsm. & Binn.
 Canthium lasianthoides Miq.
 Canthium libericum Dinkl.
 Canthium longipes Geddes
 Canthium lucidum R.Br.
 Canthium macrocarpum Thwaites
 Canthium malayense K.M.Wong
 Canthium megacarpum (Merr.) Merr.
 Canthium megistocarpum Merr. & L.M.Perry
 Canthium merrillianum Mabb.
 Canthium merrillii (Setch.) Christoph.
 Canthium mite Bartl. ex DC.
 Canthium molle King & Gamble
 Canthium moluccanum Roxb.
 Canthium oblongum (Valeton) Kaneh.
 Canthium oliganthum (Miq.) Boerl.
 Canthium oligocarpum Hiern
 Canthium parvifolium Roxb.
 Canthium paucinervium (Merr.) Merr.
 Canthium pedunculare Cav.
 Canthium perakanthus ined.
 Canthium polyanthum Miq.
 Canthium puberulum Thwaites ex Hook.f.
 Canthium quadratum Craib
 Canthium rheedei DC.
 Canthium sarcocarpum (Merr.) Merr.
 Canthium sarmentosum Craib
 Canthium scabridum Ridl.
 Canthium scandens Blume
 Canthium schlechterianum Merr. & L.M.Perry
 Canthium simile Merr. & Chun
 Canthium sordidum (K.Schum.) Bullock
 Canthium spirostylum Miq.
 Canthium stellulatum Craib
 Canthium strigosum Craib
 Canthium strychnoides Craib
 Canthium subaureum Craib
 Canthium subcapitatum (Merr.) Merr.
 Canthium suberosum Codd
 Canthium subsessilifolium (Merr.) Merr.
 Canthium tavoyanum (R.Parker) Merr.
 Canthium travancoricum Bedd.
 Canthium trichophorum Quisumb. & Merr.
 Canthium umbelligerum Miq.
 Canthium vanwykii Tilney & Kok
 Canthium villarii Vidal
 Canthium violaceum Zoll. & Moritzi

References

 
Rubiaceae genera
Afrotropical realm flora
Indomalayan realm flora
Taxa named by Jean-Baptiste Lamarck
Taxonomy articles created by Polbot